Maurea punctulata is a species of sea snail, a marine gastropod mollusk, in the family Calliostomatidae within the superfamily Trochoidea, the top snails, turban snails and their allies.

Description
The length of the shell attains 41.7 mm.

Distribution
This marine species is endemic to New Zealand.

References

 Oliver, W. R. B. (1926). New Zealand Species of Calliostoma. Proceedings of the Malacological Society of London. 17: 107-115.
 Marshall, B.A., 1995. A Revision of the Recent Calliostoma Species of New Zealand (Mollusca: Gastropoda: Trochoidea). The Nautilus 108(4): 83-127

External links
 Martyn T. (1784-1787). The universal conchologist, exhibiting the figure of every known shells. London, published by the author. 4 vols. 40 pp., 80 pls.
  Gmelin J.F. (1791). Vermes. In: Gmelin J.F. (Ed.) Caroli a Linnaei Systema Naturae per Regna Tria Naturae, Ed. 13. Tome 1(6). G.E. Beer, Lipsiae
 Noodt, J. (1819). Museum Boltenianum: Verzeichnis der von dem gestorbenen J. F. Bolten... hinterlassenen vortrefflichen Sammlung Conchylien, Mineralien und Kunstsachen die am 26. April d.J., Morgens um 10 Uhr öffentlich verkauft werden sollen durch den Makler J. Noodt. Conrad Müller, Hamburg, pp. vi + 156, 4 pls
 Finlay H.J. (1926). A further commentary on New Zealand molluscan systematics. Transactions of the New Zealand Institute. 57: 320-485, pls 18-23
 Valenciennes A. (1846). Atlas de Zoologie. Mollusques. In: A. du Petit-Thouars, Voyage autour du monde sur la frégate la Venus pendant les années 1836–1839. 4 vols. 

Calliostomatidae